Arizona Bound may refer to:

 Arizona Bound (1941 film), a 1941 American film
 Arizona Bound (1927 film), a lost 1927 American Western silent film